Heartbreak Station is the third studio album by American rock band Cinderella, released in 1990 through Mercury Records. It reached No.19 in the Billboard 200 US chart on December 21, 1990, and went platinum for shipping a million albums on February 26, 1991.

Three singles were released, two of which charted on the Billboards Hot 100 in 1991. "Shelter Me" peaked at No. 36 and the title track climbed to No. 44. "The More Things Change" did not chart.

Critical reception

Stephen Thomas Erlewine of AllMusic writes, "Cinderella reached back into the Stones and Aerosmith songbooks and created a sneering, raunchy hard rock album that was artistically their finest moment, even if it didn't reach the same commercial heights as its predecessors."

This mentioned from the Chicago Tribune website, "The band's new PolyGram Records album, Heartbreak Station, features more rootsy blues rock (the disc is scheduled for a Nov. 20 release). Yet despite Cinderella's blues leanings, critics often lump the group in with party bands like Poison and Warrant."

The LA Times writes, "Any band that can achieve a good approximation of the Stones' raw, cranking classic period--as Cinderella does here-- at least has the validity of a solid bar band. But Cinderella fails to justify and redeem its stylistic thefts by infusing a borrowed sound with a personal perspective."

People begins their review with sarcasm, "The first thing that strikes you about this new album by Poison…er, uh, this new album by Cinderella…is how utterly original it is." They continue this theme throughout: "So as I was saying, you can’t go wrong if you buy this new Mötley Crüe record. Ask for it by name."

Track listing

Personnel
Track information and credits adapted from Discogs and AllMusic, then verified from the album's liner notes.
 CinderellaTom Keifer – vocals, electric guitar, 12 & 6 string acoustic guitar, mandolin, piano, lap steel guitar, mandocello, dobro, acoustic & electric slide guitar, producer
Jeff LaBar – guitar, slide guitar
Eric Brittingham – bass
Fred Coury – drums, percussion, background vocalsAdditional musiciansBashiri Johnson – percussion
Jay Davidson – saxophone (tracks 1, 3, 10), piano (track 10)
Rod Roddy – clavinet (track 2), piano (tracks 3, 4)
Dennis Ruello – baritone saxophone (track 2)
The Memphis Horns
Andrew Love – saxophone (track 2)
Wayne Jackson – trumpet (track 2)
Jay Levin – pedal steel guitar (track 6)
Ken Hensley – organ (tracks 5, 8, 10)
Brian O'Neal – piano, organ (tracks 5, 8)
Rick Criniti – keyboards (tracks 6, 7)
John Avarese – synthesizer programming (track 9)
Roy McDonald – synthesizer programming (track 11)
John Paul Jones – string arrangements (tracks 4, 11)
Elaine Foster, Sharon Foster, Tara Pellerin – background vocals (tracks 3, 4) 
Brenda King, Carla Benson, Curtis King, Evette Benton, Tawatha Agee – background vocals (tracks 5, 8)
Eric Troyer – background vocals (track 10)ProductionJohn Jansen – producer
Gary Lyons – engineer 
Brian Stover, Nelson Ayres – assistant engineers (tracks 1 to 5, 8 to 11)
Chris Laidlaw – assistant engineer (tracks 1, 5 to 7)
Gene Foster, Jim Odom – assistant engineers (tracks 2 to 4, 11)
Matthew "Boomer" Lamonica – assistant engineer (tracks 4, 9 to 11)
Steve Thompson, Michael Barbiero – mixing
George Cowan, Mike Reiter – mixing assistants 
Mitchell Kanner – art direction, design 
Scott Townsend – design 
Andrew Clatworthy, Mark "Weissguy" Weiss, Neil Zlozower, Robert John, William Hames, Ross Halfin – photography

Charts
 

Album

SinglesShelter MeHeartbreak StationThe More Things Change'

Certifications

References

Cinderella (band) albums
1990 albums
Mercury Records albums
Vertigo Records albums
Albums recorded at Studio in the Country
Hard rock albums by American artists
Blues rock albums by American artists